Edward D. A. Pabst (1868 – June 19, 1940) was a Major League Baseball player. He played outfield in four games for the St. Louis Brows and eight games for the Philadelphia Athletics of the American Association during the 1890 baseball season. He remained active through 1904 in the minor leagues, and even managed during part of the 1902 season.

Sources

Major League Baseball outfielders
St. Louis Browns (AA) players
Philadelphia Athletics (AA) players
Baseball players from Missouri
1868 births
1940 deaths
19th-century baseball players
Atlanta Crackers managers
Minor league baseball managers
Evansville Hoosiers players
Springfield Senators players
Dallas Hams players
Terre Haute Hottentots players
Montgomery Grays players
Rockford Forest City players
Rockford Reds players
Montgomery Senators players
Fort Worth Panthers players
Paris Midlands players
New Orleans Pelicans (baseball) players
Newark Colts players
Paterson Giants players
Watsonville Hayseeds players
Watsonville Gardiners players
San Francisco Brewers players
San Francisco Wasps players
Atlanta Firemen players
San Francisco Seals (baseball) players